Leslie Hartwell Campbell (April 3, 1892 – November 25, 1970) was the 2nd president of Campbell University in Buies Creek, North Carolina.

Biography
Dr. Campbell was the eldest son of Campbell University founder, James Archibald Campbell.  His younger brother, Carlyle, also became a college president, serving Meredith College in Raleigh, North Carolina in that capacity.  Dr. Campbell was a 1911 graduate of Wake Forest College and was an earlier graduate of Buies Creek Academy, the forerunner of Campbell University.  Under Dr. Campbell's leadership, Campbell Junior College became a four-year liberal arts college in 1961.  He died on November 25, 1970.

References

1892 births
1970 deaths
Presidents of Campbell University
Wake Forest University alumni
People from Harnett County, North Carolina
20th-century American academics